Macromia splendens is a species of dragonfly in the family Macromiidae. It is found in France, Portugal, and Spain. Its natural habitats are rivers and water storage areas. It is threatened by habitat loss.

Sources

 Richard Gabb - Macromia splendens - Spendid Cruiser - European Dragonfly photos

Dragonflies of Europe
Insects described in 1843
Taxonomy articles created by Polbot